Red Alert is an Apple II shoot 'em up written by Olaf Lubeck and published by Broderbund in 1981.

Gameplay
Red Alert is a game in which the player defends against attacking aliens.

Reception
Luther Shaw reviewed the game for Computer Gaming World, and stated that "here's another in the long line of aliens-dropping-from-the-skies-being-destroyed-by-your-weapons games. While many versions of the ADFTSBDBYW type of game are very similar to the coin arcade games that they were based upon, this one has a flavor all  own."

References

External links
Review in Creative Computing

1981 video games
Alien invasions in video games
Apple II games
Apple II-only games
Broderbund games
Shoot 'em ups
Video games developed in the United States